Irving "Moon" Mondschein (February 7, 1924 – June 5, 2015) was an American track and field athlete and football player.

Personal life
Mondschein, who was Jewish, was born in Brooklyn, New York.  He attended Boys High School, where he ran track.  He also ran for the New York Pioneer Club.  He entered the US Army in 1943. He became a member of the Pi Lambda Phi fraternal organization while attending New York University His son, Brian, was a world-class decathlete in the 1980s.  His grandson, also named Brian, was an All-American pole vaulter at Virginia Tech.

Decathlon, high jump, and football career
He was AAU decathlon champion in 1944, and in 1946 and 1947.  He won the 1944 Olympic Trials and would have been the top American representative had the Olympic Games been held that year.  He was NCAA high jump champion in both 1947 and 1948, competing for New York University.  As of 2015, he still held NYU's record in the outdoor high jump—6 feet, 7¾ inches.  He also played football as an end for NYU in 1946, earning All-East honors. He competed in the 1948 Olympics for the United States in decathlon, coming in eighth, as teammate Bob Mathias won the gold medal. In his career, he was ranked third in the world in outdoor high jump and tenth in the decathlon in 1947; sixth in the indoor high jump and eighth in the decathlon in 1948; and third in the outdoor high jump and sixth in the decathlon in 1949.

Coaching career
He later coached track, basketball, and football at Lincoln University in Oxford, Pennsylvania, starting in 1949.  He coached the US track and field team at the 1950 Maccabiah Games, which included Olympian Henry Laskau (national champion and world record holder) who won a gold medal in racewalking, and was also an advisor to the Israeli Ministry of Education, helping for two years to prepare the country's  athletes for the 1952 Olympics.  Irv was also athletic coach (Track) at Lawrence High School, Cedarhurst, NY ( Nassau County) from 1963-65.  He was then a coach at the University of Pennsylvania; first the assistant track coach (1965–79) and then the head coach (1979–87).  He was also an assistant coach on the 1988 U.S. Olympic team. He was previously an assistant coach at Kutztown University, and also volunteered as an assistant coach at Haverford College.  He also served as an assistant coach at La Salle University in Philadelphia.

Honors
He is a member of the Philadelphia Jewish Sports Hall of Fame, the New York Jewish Sports Hall of Fame, and the National Jewish Sports Hall of Fame.  He is also a member of the NYU Athletics Hall of Fame, and the U.S. Track & Field and Cross Country Coaches Association Hall of Fame.

Head coaching record

Football

References

External links
 University of Pennsylvania profile

1924 births
2015 deaths
American football ends
American male decathletes
American male high jumpers
Athletes (track and field) at the 1948 Summer Olympics
Lincoln Lions football coaches
Lincoln Lions men's basketball coaches
NYU Violets football players
Penn Quakers track and field coaches
College men's track and field athletes in the United States
Olympic track and field athletes of the United States
United States Army personnel of World War II
Boys High School (Brooklyn) alumni
Sportspeople from Brooklyn
Coaches of American football from New York (state)
Players of American football from New York City
Basketball coaches from New York (state)
Track and field athletes from New York City
Jewish American sportspeople
21st-century American Jews